Li Zhiguo (born October 1956) is a Chinese diplomat and the Chinese ambassador to Libya.

Life and career
Li was born in Heilongjiang, in October 1956. He graduated from Beijing Foreign Studies University, majoring in English language.

From 1997 to 2001 he was China's consulate general in Dubai.

In 2006 he was promoted to become the Chinese Ambassador to Bahrain, a position he held until 2009.

He was China's consulate general in Juba in November 2010, and held that office until August 2011.

In September 2011, he was appointed the Chinese Ambassador to South Sudan by Chinese president Hu Jintao, he remained in that position until July 2013, when he was transferred to Tripoli, capital of Libya, and appointed the Chinese Ambassador.

References

1956 births
Beijing Foreign Studies University alumni
Living people
Ambassadors of China to Libya
Ambassadors of China to South Sudan
Ambassadors of China to Bahrain